Meriton is a surname. Notable people with the surname include:

 George Meriton (died 1624), English churchman
 Henry Meriton (1762–1826), English sea captain
 Thomas Meriton (born 1638), English dramatist and cleric
 Vincent Meriton (born 1960), Seychellois politician

See also
 Meriton (disambiguation)